The 2009 World Wheelchair Curling Championship was held from February 21–28 at the Vancouver Paralympic Centre in Vancouver, British Columbia, Canada. In the final

Teams participating in the 2009 World Wheelchair Curling Championship earned qualification points from this event for the Winter Paralympic Games in Vancouver in 2010.

Qualification
 (Host country)
Top seven finishers from the 2008 World Wheelchair Curling Championship (not including host):
 
 
 
 

 
 
 Top teams from qualifying event:

Qualification event

Two teams outside of the top finishers qualified from a qualifying event held in November 2008 in Prague, Czech Republic.

Teams

Round robin standings

Results

Draw 1
Saturday, February 21, 12:30

Draw 2
Saturday, February 21, 12:30

Draw 3
Sunday, February 22, 12:30

Draw 4
Sunday, February 22, 18:00

Draw 5
Monday, February 23, 12:30

Draw 6
Monday, February 23, 18:00

Draw 7
Tuesday, February 24, 12:30

Draw 8
Tuesday, February 24, 18:00

Draw 9
Wednesday, February 25, 12:30

Draw 10
Wednesday, February 25, 18:00

Draw 11
Thursday, February 26, 9:00

Draw 12
Thursday, February 26, 14:30

Ranking Tiebreakers

Round 1
Thursday, February 26, 20:00

Round 2
Friday, February 27, 9:00

Round 3
Friday, February 27, 14:30

Playoffs

1 vs. 2
Friday, February 27, 20:00

3 vs. 4
Friday, February 27, 20:00

Semifinal
Saturday, February 28, 9:00

Bronze medal game
Saturday, February 28, 14:30

Gold medal game
Saturday, February 28, 14:30

External links

World Wheelchair Curling Championship
Sport in Vancouver
World Wheelchair Curling Championship
Curling in British Columbia
2009 in Canadian curling